Taila Santos (born June 22, 1993) is a Brazilian mixed martial artist who competes in the Flyweight division of the Ultimate Fighting Championship. As of March 7, 2023, she is #3 in the UFC women's flyweight rankings, and #12 in the UFC women's pound-for-pound rankings.

Background

With her father being a Muay Thai coach, she started training it at the age of 16, soon afterwards being enrolled in a championship at Chute Boxe of Curitiba, which Taila went to win. Taila started to train Jiu-Jitsu, with her father organizing an MMA fight so that Taila could debut in the sport. She went and won again. Afterwards, her father contacted Marcelo Brigadeiro to organize the trip to Astra Fight, in Balneário Camboriú, where she resides today.

Mixed martial arts career

Early career

After going the distance in her 2013 pro debut, she would go on to finish her next 10 bouts in the first round. In 2016, her one appearance came against Laisa Coimbra for the Aspera FC Bantamweight Championship. She won the title with an 87-second knockout — via a punch to the body. Taila set to fight with fellow Brazilian prospect Mariana Morais, but Morais withdrew from the Aspera FC 32 bout. Being booked for her Invicta FC debut against Irene Aldana, Santos had to pull out due to visa issues.

After two year layoff, she was invited onto Dana White's Contender Series Brazil 2 where she faced off at Flyweight against Estefani Almeida. She won the unanimous decision and earned a UFC contract.

Ultimate Fighting Championship

Santos made her UFC debut against Mara Romero Borella on February 2, 2019 at UFC Fight Night: Assunção vs. Moraes 2. She lost the fight by split decision.

Taila faced Molly McCann on 16 July 2020 at UFC on ESPN: Kattar vs. Ige. She won the fight via unanimous decision.

Santos was scheduled to face Maryna Moroz on December 5, 2020 at UFC on ESPN: Hermansson vs. Vettori. However on November 18, it was announced that Moroz had to pull out and she was replaced by Montana De La Rosa. Just hours before the event, the UFC decided to remove the fight after one of De La Rosa's cornermen tested positive for COVID-19. Santos was then rescheduled to face Gillian Robertson two weeks later at UFC Fight Night: Thompson vs. Neal. Santos won the fight via unanimous decision.

Santos was scheduled to face Roxanne Modafferi on May 8, 2021 at UFC on ESPN 24. However, Modafferi was forced to pull out from the event citing a  meniscus tear.

Santos was scheduled to face Mandy Böhm on September 4, 2021 at UFC Fight Night 191. However, Santos was pulled from the bout due to visa issues and was replaced by Ariane Lipski.

Santos faced Roxanne Modafferi in a flyweight bout on September 25, 2021 at UFC 266. She won the fight via unanimous decision.

Santos faced Joanne Wood on November 20, 2021 at UFC Fight Night 198. After knocking Wood down twice, Santos won the bout via rear-naked choke at the end of the first round. This fight earned her the Performance of the Night award.

Santos faced Valentina Shevchenko for the UFC Women's Flyweight Championship on June 11, 2022, at UFC 275. She lost the close bout by split decision, becoming the first fighter to win on a judge's scorecard against Shevchenko, in the flyweight division.

Santos was scheduled to face Erin Blanchfield on February 18, 2023 at UFC Fight Night 219. The main event fight between Cory Sandhagen and Marlon Vera was rescheduled to another event, and Santos' fight against Blanchfield was promoted to the main event. However, just one week out from the event, Santos withdrew after her cornermen were denied visas into the United States and was replaced by former UFC Women's Strawweight Champion Jéssica Andrade.

Championships and accomplishments

Mixed martial arts
Ultimate Fighting Championship
Performance of the Night (One time) 
Aspera Fighting Championship
Aspera FC Bantamweight Championship (One time)

Mixed martial arts record

|Loss
|align=center|19–2
|Valentina Shevchenko
|Decision (split)
|UFC 275
|
|align=center|5
|align=center|5:00
|Kallang, Singapore
|
|-
|Win
|align=center|19–1
|Joanne Wood
|Submission (rear-naked choke)
|UFC Fight Night: Vieira vs. Tate
|
|align=center|1
|align=center|4:49
|Las Vegas, Nevada, United States
|
|-
|Win
|align=center|18–1
|Roxanne Modafferi
|Decision (unanimous)
|UFC 266
|
|align=center|3
|align=center|5:00
|Las Vegas, Nevada, United States
|
|-
|Win
|align=center|17–1
|Gillian Robertson
|Decision (unanimous)
|UFC Fight Night: Thompson vs. Neal
|
|align=center|3
|align=center|5:00
|Las Vegas, Nevada, United States
|
|-
| Win
| align=center|16–1
| Molly McCann
|Decision (unanimous)
|UFC on ESPN: Kattar vs. Ige 
|
|align=center|3
|align=center|5:00
|Abu Dhabi, United Arab Emirates
|
|-
| Loss
| align=center|15–1
| Mara Romero Borella
|Decision (split)
|UFC Fight Night: Assunção vs. Moraes 2
|
|align=center|3
|align=center|5:00
|Fortaleza, Brazil 
|
|-
| Win
| align=center| 15–0
| Estefani Almeida
| Decision (unanimous)
|Dana White's Contender Series Brazil 2
|
|align=center|3
|align=center|5:00
|Las Vegas, Nevada, United States
| 
|-
| Win
| align=center| 14–0
| Laisa Coimbra
| KO (punch to the body)
|Aspera FC 43
|
|align=center|1 
|align=center|1:27
|Paranaguá, Brazil
|
|-
| Win
| align=center| 13–0
| Bruna Rosso
|KO (elbow)
|K.O. Combate 2
|
|align=center|2
|align=center|3:06
|Caçador, Brazil
|
|-
| Win
| align=center| 12–0
| Gisele Moreira
| Decision (unanimous)
| Aspera FC 23
| 
| align=center| 3
| align=center| 5:00
| Joinville, Brazil
|
|-
| Win
| align=center|11–0
| Gisele Pereira
| TKO (head kick)
| Aspera FC 20
| 
| align=center|1
| align=center|1:06
| Navegantes, Brazil
|
|-
| Win
| align=center|10–0
| Wellen Taynara Sobrinho
| TKO (doctor stoppage)
| Aspera FC 19
| 
| align=center|1
| align=center|5:00
| Lages, Brazil
|
|-
| Win
| align=center|9–0
| Ana Paula da Silva
| TKO (punches)
| Noxii Combat 1
| 
| align=center|1
| align=center|2:12
| Joinville, Brazil
|
|-
| Win
| align=center|8–0
| Juliana Martins
| Submission (keylock)
| Aspera FC 17
| 
| align=center|1
| align=center|0:48
| Curitibanos, Brazil
|
|-
| Win
| align=center| 7–0
| Daniela Cristina Patricia
| TKO (elbows)
| Aspera FC 16
| 
| align=center|1
| align=center|0:26
| Joinville, Brazil
| 
|-
| Win
| align=center| 6–0
| Gabriela Bueno
| Submission
| MMA Total Combat 2
|
|align=Center|1
|align=center|1:17
|São Bento do Sul, Brazil
| 
|-
| Win
| align=center| 5–0
| Marta Souza
| KO (punch)
| Aspera FC 15
| 
| align=center| 1
| align=center| 2:36
| Itapema, Brazil
| 
|-
| Win
| align=center| 4–0
| Rachael Cummins
| TKO (punches)
| XFC International 6
| 
| align=center| 1
| align=center| 4:28
| São Paulo, Brazil
|
|-
| Win
| align=center| 3–0
| Geisyele Nascimento
| KO (head kick)
| University of Champions 1
| 
| align=center| 1
| align=center| 0:30
| Curitiba, Brazil
| 
|-
| Win
| align=center| 2–0
| Kessiny Mara
| TKO (punches)
| Aspera FC 4
| 
| align=center| 1
| align=center|2:20
| Itapema, Brazil
|
|-
| Win
| align=center| 1–0
| Josiane Nunes de Lima
| Decision (unanimous)
| Striker's House Cup 31
| 
| align=center| 3
| align=center| 5:00
| Curitiba, Brazil
|

See also 
 List of current UFC fighters
 List of female mixed martial artists

References

External links
 
 

1993 births
Living people
Brazilian female mixed martial artists
Flyweight mixed martial artists
Mixed martial artists utilizing Muay Thai
Mixed martial artists utilizing Brazilian jiu-jitsu
Ultimate Fighting Championship female fighters
Brazilian Muay Thai practitioners
Female Muay Thai practitioners
Brazilian practitioners of Brazilian jiu-jitsu
Female Brazilian jiu-jitsu practitioners